Euxoa excogita is a moth of the family Noctuidae. It is found from British Columbia, south to California. It has also been recorded from Colorado.

Euxoa excogita was formerly considered a subspecies of Euxoa brunneigera.

References 

Euxoa
Moths of North America
Moths described in 1900